Elizabeth Anna Ainsworth (commonly identified as Lisa Ainsworth) is an American plant physiologist currently employed by the United States Department of Agriculture (USDA) Agricultural Research Service (ARS). She also is an Adjunct Professor of the University of Illinois at Urbana-Champaign (UIUC), a Fellow of the American Association for the Advancement of Science (AAAS) and was awarded the 2018 Crop Science Society of America Presidential Award. She is known for her work concerning the effects of specific atmospheric pollutants, including ozone and carbon dioxide, on the productivity of selected major crops such as corn and soybeans.

A highly influential researcher, Ainsworth was ranked in the top 1% by citations for her field in 2016, 2017, 2018, 2019, and 2022.

Early life and education 
Ainsworth grew up in small town Illinois, United States where she worked on a corn field. Ainsworth earned a bachelor's degree at the University of California, Los Angeles. Here she discovered ecology, and spent two semesters completing field work in Thailand. Ainsworth was inspired by her first measurements of photosynthesis to dedicate her research career to plant biology. She was a doctoral student under the supervision of Stephen P. Long at the University of Illinois at Urbana–Champaign, before spending a year as a Humboldt Fellow at Juelich Research Center.

Research and career 
Ainsworth is a plant physiologist at the United States Department of Agriculture Agricultural Research Service with the Global Change and Photosynthesis Research Unit. She holds an adjunct position at the University of Illinois at Urbana–Champaign. Her research was the first to make use of biochemical and genomic tools to establish the mechanisms by which plants respond to climate change. In particular, Ainsworth studies how rising levels of carbon dioxide and ground level ozone impact crop production. At the University of Illinois at Urbana–Champaign Ainsworth is a lead investigator of SoyFACE (Free Air Concentration Enrichment). As part of SoyFACE Ainsworth leads an open-air laboratory that allows her to grow plants in atmospheric conditions that are similar to those predicted to be present in 2050. It is important to grow the soybeans out of a greenhouse to ensure their phenotype is more representative of those farmed in the real world.

SoyFACE is a multi-faceted study that involves the use of satellite instruments, ozone surface monitors, metablomic approaches and historical yield data. This has involved monitoring genetic variation in maizes in response to elevated concentrations of ozone. To achieve this, Ainsworth has developed high-throughput DNA phenotyping to understand the genes and networks of genes responsible for ozone sensitivity. This allows her to establish the genetic changes that occur in plants due to climate change, as well as monitoring which plant species survive best in an effort to breed more ozone-tolerant varieties. She showed that during the 2010s a large proportion of the United States soybean and corn harvest has been lost to ozone pollution. She estimates that current ozone levels decrease corn yields by up to 10%, which is comparable to the amount lost to drought, flooding or pests. In 2011 Ainsworth identified that future levels of ground-level ozone could reduce the yields of soybeans by almost one quarter by 2050.

Academic service 
Alongside her academic career, Ainsworth is involved with initiatives to increase the representation of women in science. She has led summer camps for high school girls (Pollen Power) to teach young people about plant science and the Earth's future climate. She is involved with the Plantae Women in Plant Biology network.

Awards and honours 
Her awards and honours include:

 2009 USDA ARS Midwest Area Early Career Research Scientist of the Year
 2011 Society for Experimental Biology President's Medal
 2012 American Society of Plant Biologists Charles Albert Shull Award
 2012 University of Illinois at Urbana–Champaign University Scholar
 2015 United States Department of Agriculture Agricultural Research Service Diversity & Equal Opportunity Award
 2018 Crop Science Society of America Presidential Award
 2019 National Academy of Sciences Prize in Food & Agricultural Sciences
 2019 Elected Fellow of the American Association for the Advancement of Science
2020 Elected member of the National Academy of Sciences

Selected publications 
Her publications include:

 
 
 

The publication list on her UICI web page identifies her as author or co-author of 33 articles about her work from 2014 through 2019.

Ainsworth serves on the editorial board of Plant, Cell & Environment. She appeared on the Clarivate Analytics Highly Cited Researchers List in both 2016, 2017 and 2018.

References 

Living people
Year of birth missing (living people)
Women physiologists
American women biologists
Academics from Illinois
University of California, Los Angeles alumni
University of Illinois Urbana-Champaign faculty
University of Illinois College of Agriculture, Consumer, and Environmental Sciences alumni
Plant physiologists
Members of the United States National Academy of Sciences
21st-century American women